Lloyd Perry Casner (August 30, 1928 in Miami, Florida – April 10, 1965 in Le Mans, France) was an American race car driver and the creator of the Casner Motor Racing Division team.

An airline pilot by trade, "Lucky" Casner developed an interest in the Maserati Birdcage, and started his team in order to enter the 1960 24 Hours of Le Mans. In August 1960, a Tipo 61 entered by Casner's Team Camoradi, driven by Stirling Moss and Dan Gurney, won the 1000 km of Nurburgring.

Sharing a Birdcage with Masten Gregory, Casner won the 1961 1000km Nürburgring for Team Camoradi, but never won Le Mans. He was killed when he crashed a new Maserati during testing for the upcoming 1965 24 Hours of Le Mans. He was featured in the 1961 film The Green Helmet.

Casner participated in one non-Championship Formula One race, the 1961 Glover Trophy.

Non-Championship Formula One results
(key) (Races in bold indicate pole position)
(Races in italics indicate fastest lap)

External links
 historicracing.com profile on Casner
 

1928 births
1965 deaths
American Formula One drivers
24 Hours of Le Mans drivers
Racing drivers from Miami
Racing drivers who died while racing
Sport deaths in France
World Sportscar Championship drivers
Commercial aviators
Formula One team owners